Louis Prang (March 12, 1824June 15, 1909) was an American printer, lithographer, publisher, and Georgist. He is sometimes known as the "father of the American Christmas card".

Youth 

Prang was born in Breslau in Prussian Silesia. His father Jonas Louis Prang was a textile manufacturer and of French Huguenot origin; his mother, Rosina Silverman, was German. Because of health problems as a boy, Prang was unable to receive much standard schooling and became an apprentice to his father, learning engraving and calico dyeing and printing. In the early 1840s, Prang travelled around Bohemia working in printing and textiles. However, after some travel in Europe, he became involved in revolutionary activities in 1848. Pursued by the Prussian government, he went to Switzerland and in 1850 emigrated to the United States and Boston, Massachusetts.

Early work 
Prang's early activities in the US publishing architectural books and making leather goods were not very successful, and he began to make wood engravings for illustrations in books. In 1851 he worked for Frank Leslie, art director for Gleason's Pictorial Drawing-Room Companion, and later with John Andrew of John Andrew & Son.

Lithography and career 
In 1856, Prang and a partner created a press, Prang and Mayer, to produce lithographs. The company specialized in prints of buildings and towns in Massachusetts. In 1860, he bought out his partner, creating L. Prang & Company and began work in color printing of advertising and other forms of business materials. The firm became quite successful, and became known for war maps, printed during the American Civil War and distributed by newspapers.

In 1864, Prang went to Europe to learn about cutting-edge German lithography.  Returning the next year, he began to create high quality reproductions of major art works. Prang also began creating series of popular album cards, advertised to be collected into scrapbooks, showing natural scenes and patriotic symbols. At Christmas 1873, Prang began creating greeting cards for the popular market in England and began selling the Christmas card in America in 1874; he is sometimes called the "father of the American Christmas card". Prang is also known for his efforts to improve art education in the US, publishing instructional books and creating a foundation to train art teachers.

Prang was an active supporter of women artists, both commissioning and collecting artworks by women. Many of his lithographs featured works by female artists, such as the botanical illustration of Ellen Thayer Fisher. In 1881, his company employed more than one hundred women.

In June 1886 Prang published a series of prints under the title Prang's War Pictures: Aquarelle Facsimile Prints. These became popular and helped inspire a genre of such prints, particularly the series issued by Kurz and Allison. However, Prang aimed at a more modern and individual treatment, as opposed to the panoramic style of Kurz and Allison, and before them, Currier and Ives.

In 1897 L. Prang & Company merged with the Taber Art Company of New Bedford, Massachusetts, creating the Taber-Prang Company and moved to Springfield, Massachusetts.

Prang died of pleuropneumonia on June 15, 1909, at the Glendale Sanitarium in Los Angeles. He is buried in Forest Hills Cemetery in Jamaica Plain, Massachusetts.

Louie Awards
Since 1988 the Greeting Card Association, the trade association representing the greeting card industry in the US, has held an annual award ceremony for the best greetings cards published that year. The awards are called Louies in recognition of Louis Prang. The most successful winner of Louie Awards is the California-based company Meri Meri. Between 1991 and 2005 the company won 81 Awards including 13 in 2005.

Personal life
On November 1, 1851, Prang married Rosa Gerber, of Bern; she died on June 2, 1898, and on April 15, 1900, he married Mary Dana Hicks.

Lithographs

See also

Notes

References 
 Bethany Neubauer (February 2000). "Prang, Louis". American National Biography Online. Taber Prang Art Co.

External links

  The Winterthur Library Overview of an archival collection on Louis Prang
 Louis Prang & Company Collection The Boston Public Library's Louis Prang & Company Collection on Flickr.com
 Prang maps at the British Library
 The Louis Prang papers, 1848–1932, Archives of American Art, Smithsonian Institution

1824 births
1909 deaths
Businesspeople from Wrocław
American printers
German-American Forty-Eighters
People from the Province of Silesia
Businesspeople from Boston
Roxbury, Boston
Greeting cards
Paper products
19th-century American businesspeople
Georgists